Richie or Richy is a masculine given name or short form (hypocorism) of Richard. It is also a surname.

First name 
Richie Ashburn (1927–1997), American Major League Baseball player, member of the Hall of Fame
Richie Benaud (1930–2015), Australian cricketer and commentator
Richie Blackmore (born 1969), New Zealand rugby league coach and former player
Richie Byrne (born 1981), Irish footballer
Richie Cunningham (born 1970), American former National Football League placekicker
Richie Emselle (1917–1992), Australian rules footballer
Richie Grant (disambiguation), multiple people
Richie Havens (1941–2013), American singer-songwriter and guitarist
Richie Hebner (born 1947), American former Major League Baseball player
Richie Incognito (born 1983), American National Football League player
Richie James (born 1995), American football player
Richie Jen (任賢齊) (born 1966), Taiwanese singer
Richie Lucas (born 1938), American former football quarterback, member of the College Football Hall of Fame
Richie McCaw (born 1980), New Zealand former rugby union player, the most capped test rugby player of all time
Richie McDonald (born 1962), American country music singer and former lead singer of the band Lonestar
Richy Müller (born 1955), German actor born Hans-Jürgen Müller
Richie Murray (born 1982), Irish hurler
Richy Peña (born 1984), Dominican-born American music producer
Richie Power (disambiguation), multiple people
Ricardo Álvarez Puig (born 1984), Spanish footballer known as Richy
Richie Ryan (born 1985), Irish footballer
Richie Ryan (1929-2019), Irish former politician
Richie Sambora (born 1959),  American rock guitarist, producer, singer and songwriter, former lead guitarist of Bon Jovi
Richie Scheinblum (1942–2021), American Major League Baseball All Star outfielder
Richie Williams (born 1987), American basketball player
Richie Woodhall (born 1968), British former boxer, WBC super middleweight titleholder

Surname
David Richie (born 1973), American former National Football League player
Donald Richie (1924–2013), American author specializing in Japanese culture
Ladale Richie (born 1989), Jamaican footballer
Lionel Richie (born 1949), American singer, songwriter, musician, record producer and actor
Nicole Richie (born 1981), American actress, daughter of Lionel Richie
Shane Richie (born 1964), English actor, comedian, singer and presenter
Sofia Richie (born 1998), American fashion model, daughter of Lionel Richie

Fictional characters
Richie, a character in the 2000 American fantasy-comedy TV movie Life-Size
Richie Aprile from The Sopranos
Richie Cunningham from Happy Days
Richie Foley, aka Gear, from Static Shock
Richie Rich, the main character of the comics, TV show, and film of the same name, and Harvey Girls Forever!
Richie Richard, from Bottom
Richie Ryan, from Highlander
Richie Tozier, from the Stephen King book It
 Richie Underwood, from Dog House

See also
Richie (film), 2017 Indian film
Ritchie (disambiguation), includes a list of people with given name or surname Ritchie

English masculine given names
Hypocorisms